El vuelo del águila (The Flight of the Eagle) is a Mexican telenovela produced by Ernesto Alonso and Carlos Sotomayor for Televisa in 1994–1995. Telenovela based on the Mexican soldier and President of Mexico Porfirio Díaz, from his name had come out the title "Época Porfiriana" or "Porfiriato" during the period of his rule, in the years 1876–1911.

It starred Manuel Ojeda, Jacqueline Andere, Humberto Zurita, Mariana Levy, Patricia Reyes Spíndola, Ernesto Gómez Cruz and Alma Delfina.

Plot 
A military hero of the Reform War, called Porfirio Díaz, was also one of the most important strategists behind the overthrow of the Second Mexican Empire. Diaz tried several times to come to power through military coups, until a last revolution in 1876 led him to the Presidency of the Republic. Except for a brief period (1880-1884), Porfirio Díaz ruled until 1911, when the takeover by Francisco I. Madero forced him to resign and go into exile.

Diaz lived to see his revolution undone and how all the profits made were destroyed by their own very long stay in power. As a hero or a cunning weaver of intrigues, Porfirio Díaz learns, fight, machine, rules, kill, peaceful, love, suffering, crying and devotion dedicated to his work without ever leave until their own people rebels to expel power.

Cast 
 
Manuel Ojeda as Porfirio Díaz
Jacqueline Andere as Carmen Romero Rubio
Humberto Zurita as Porfirio Díaz (adult)
Mariana Levy as Carmen Romero Rubio (young)
Patricia Reyes Spíndola as Petrona Mori
Ernesto Gómez Cruz as Benito Juárez
Alma Delfina as Delfina Ortega Díaz
Gastón Tuset as Mariano Escobedo
Claudio Brook as Manuel Romero Rubio
Beatriz Aguirre as Agustina de Romero Rubio
Irán Eory as Agustina de Romero Rubio (young)
Israel Jaitovich as Manuel González Flores (young)
Roberto D'Amico as Manuel González Flores (adult)
Socorro Bonilla as Margarita Maza de Juárez
César Castro as Sebastián Lerdo de Tejada
Mario Casillas as Carlos Pacheco
Martha Mariana Castro as Rafaela Quiñones/Justa Saavedra
Ismael Aguilar as Tomás Mejía Camacho
Isabel Andrade as Desideria Díaz
Roberto Antúnez as Cenobio Márquez
Armando Araiza as Bolero
Roberto Ballesteros as Vicente Guerrero
Luis Bayardo as Francisco I. Madero
Óscar Bonfiglio as Gustavo A. Madero
Diana Bracho as Atala Pérez Olazábal de Madero
Raúl Buenfil as Ignacio Zaragoza
Quintín Bulnes as Henry Lane Wilson
Juan Carlos Casasola as Francisco Zarco
Óscar Castaneda as Emiliano Zapata
Aaron Hernan as Bernardo Reyes
Lumi Cavazos as Amada Díaz
Jorge Celaya as Esteban Aragón
Uriel Chávez as Homobono
Eugenio Cobo as Venustiano Carranza
Juan Carlos Colombo as Melchor Ocampo
Carlos Corres as Justo (16 years old)
Constantino Costas as Espinoza/Gorostiza
Pedro Damián as José María Pino Suárez
Dulce María as Delfina (child)
Julieta Egurrola  as Luisa Romero Rubio
Humberto Elizondo as Manuel Mondragón
José Antonio Ferral as Father Pardo
Laura Flores as Empress Carlota of Mexico
Esteban Franco as Félix Díaz
Rocío Gallardo as Damiana
Juan Pablo Garcíadiego as Luis Mier y Terán
Fidel Garriga as José María Iglesias
Jaime Garza as Ricardo Flores Magón
Luis Gimeno as Napoleon III
Magda Giner as María Cañas Buch
Miguel Gómez Checa as Marcos Pérez
Sergio Goyri as Jesús González Ortega
Salma Hayek as Juana Catalina Romero
Mel Herrera as Porfirio Díaz Ortega
Blanca Ireri Espinosa as Delfina (9 years old)
José Antonio Iturriaga as Flavio Maldonado
Luz María Jerez as Doña Inés
Eduardo Liñán as François Achille Bazaine
Ángeles Marín as Nicolasa Díaz
Beatriz Martinez as Archduchess Sophie of Bavaria
Mario Iván Martínez as Maximilian I of Mexico
Antonio Medellin as Felipe Berriozábal
Ramón Menéndez as Manuel González de Cosío
Raúl Meraz as Francisco León de la Barra
Maristel Molina as Paula de Anda
Roberto Montiel as Dr. Manuel Antonio Ortega
Óscar Morelli as Ignacio Martínez de Pinillos
José Luis Moreno López as Ignacio Mejía
Juan Carlos Muñoz as Miguel Miramón
Montserrat Ontiveros as Nicolasa Díaz (16 years old)/Sofía Romero Rubio
Claudia Ortega as Manuela Díaz (18 years old)
Adalberto Parra as Juan Nepomuceno Almonte
Tito Reséndiz as Ignacio Comonfort
Bruno Rey as Victoriano Huerta
Guillermo Rivas as Pelagio Antonio de Labastida y Dávalos
Fabián Robles as Porfirio Díaz (15 years old)
Julián Robles as Félix Díaz (15 years old)
Juan Romanca as Guillermo Prieto
Alejandro Ruiz as Justo Benítez
Roberto Ruy as Juan
Héctor Sáez as Jerónimo Treviño
Polo Salazar as López Lazcano
Óscar Sánchez as Durán Roa
Salvador Sánchez as Ignacio Ramírez
Sergio Sánchez as José Ives Limantour
Juan Carlos Serrán as Félix Zuloaga
Evangelina Sosa as Delfina (young)
Moisés Suarez as José Agustín Domínguez y Díaz
Zulema Williams as Vicenta
Luis Xavier as Franz Joseph I of Austria
Eduardo Santamarina as Dr. Manuel Antonio Ortega Reyes
Miguel Ángel Biaggio
Luis Cárdenas
Guillermo Iván
Alfonso Iturralde
Alejandro Montoya
José María Negri
Arturo Ríos
Elías Rubio

Awards

References

External links

1994 telenovelas
Mexican telenovelas
1994 Mexican television series debuts
1995 Mexican television series endings
Spanish-language telenovelas
Television shows set in Mexico
Televisa telenovelas
Cultural depictions of Porfirio Díaz